Gyeolmyeongja-cha or sicklepod tea is a tea made from roasted (but not ground) seeds of Senna (formerly Cassia) spp., especially S. obtusifolia and S. tora.

Ingredient 

One source however identifies the ingredient as a plant related to Cassia nomame, synonymous with Chamaecrista nomame.

Preparation 
Sugar or honey is not added.

Use 
The name gyeolmyeongja means "the seed that brightens the eyes". Gyeolmyeongja-cha is also used as herbal medicine.

Similar beverages 
In Japan, the habu-cha originally referred to an infusion of roasted cassia seeds brewed from habusō or S. occidentalis, but the habu-cha now commercially sold is usually made from S. obtusifolia.

Cassia seed tea is consumed not only in East Asia (China, Japan, Korea), but in Southeast Asia (Thailand, etc.) as well. In Thailand, S. ora is called ; the roasted seeds are used as diuretic, and the seeds or leaves as purgative.

Cassia tora seeds which are roasted and ground have been noticed as ersatz coffee in India, and C. occidentali also brewed into what used to be called "negro coffee" in Africa, South America, and the West Indies. The leaves have also been used for substitute coffee in India, though unflavorful.

See also 
 Roasted grain beverage

References 

Herbal tea
Korean tea